Ernie Reyes Jr. (born January 15, 1972) is an American actor and martial artist, known for his acting work in films such as The Last Dragon, Red Sonja (1985), as Donatello's stuntman in Teenage Mutant Ninja Turtles, Teenage Mutant Ninja Turtles II: The Secret of the Ooze (1991), Surf Ninjas (1993) and The Rundown (2003). He has also done stunt work in films such as Indiana Jones and the Kingdom of the Crystal Skull, as well as motion capture stunts in films such as Avatar and Alice in Wonderland. His TV work includes season 3 episode 4 Highway to Heaven dramas such as the short-lived Sidekicks (in which he co-starred with Gil Gerard) and NCIS: Los Angeles and reality TV series such as Final Fu.

Early life
Reyes was born in San Jose, California, to actor/stuntman Ernie Reyes Sr. and is the grandson of Filipino immigrants. He has three brothers and two sisters, one of whom, Lee Reyes, is a boxer and another, Santino Ramos, is a filmmaker/artist. By the age of six, Reyes had joined his father's group, the "West Coast Demo Team".

Career
Reyes made his film debut at age 13 in the 1985 film The Last Dragon. The same year he shared the screen with Arnold Schwarzenegger and Brigitte Nielsen in Red Sonja. During this time, he also had his own television series, Sidekicks, a spin-off of the original Walt Disney one-time special The Last Electric Knight, alongside Gil Gerard presented by Michael Eisner. He also appeared in an episode of the hit television series MacGyver in 1988. Reyes had starring roles in Surf Ninjas, the second Teenage Mutant Ninja Turtles film, The Secret of the Ooze, as Keno, the pizza delivery boy. He also served as the martial arts stunt double for Donatello in the first Ninja Turtles film. He later appeared in films such as Rush Hour 2 playing Zing and in The Rundown alongside WWE wrestler Dwayne "The Rock" Johnson. Reyes guest starred in three episodes of the TV series Kung Fu: The Legend Continues alongside David Carradine.

In 2006, Reyes hosted the MTV martial arts reality show Final Fu.

Reyes has a professional fight record of 3–0 in Strikeforce which was a large mixed martial arts organization but started out as a Muay Thai and kickboxing organization. Ernie fought Anthony Elkaim the WKA ISKA Champion. Reyes knocked out the champion in the 3rd round. His next two fights would be won by decision, including a unanimous decision over Veasna Thach, which aired on ESPN. Ernie Reyes Jr.'s fight against the champion Anthony Elkaim also aired on ESPN.

Reyes has done motion capture stunts for blockbuster films such as Avatar and Alice in Wonderland. He also played a cemetery warrior in Indiana Jones and the Kingdom of the Crystal Skull who gets killed by his own poison dart. Reyes guest starred on NCIS: Los Angeles "The Frozen Lake" playing "Jay Thapa", a Nepalese soldier who is an expert in knife-fighting.

Personal life

In October 31 2007, he and his wife Lisa had a daughter, Lotus Blossom, who appeared in the 2020 film We Can Be Heroes. On January 7, 2013, he and his wife had a second child named Phoenix Reyes. 

In June 2015, it was reported that Reyes was suffering from kidney failure and was in need of a transplant. According to his sister, Reyes undergoes dialysis three times per week for four hours each day. His family set up a GoFundMe campaign to help raise $75,000 for his medical expenses. In August 2022, Reyes revealed that the transplant had been successful and that he was healthy.

Filmography

As actor

As stunt performer

Kickboxing record 

|-  bgcolor="#CCFFCC"
| 2005-10-00 || Win ||align=left| Ryan Fotheringham || Strikeforce || San Jose, California, USA || Decision || 5 || 3:00 || 3-0
|-  bgcolor="#CCFFCC"
| 1999-00-00 || Win ||align=left| Veasna Thach || Strikeforce || San Jose, California, USA || Decision (unanimous)  || 5 || 3:00 || 2-0
|-  bgcolor="#CCFFCC"
| 1998-00-00 || Win ||align=left| Anthony Elkaim || Strikeforce || Milan, Italy || KO || 3 || || 1-0
|-
| colspan=9 | Legend:

See also
Patusan

References

External links

1972 births
American sportspeople of Filipino descent
American male film actors
American stunt performers
American male television actors
Male actors from San Jose, California
American male kickboxers
Kickboxers from California
Welterweight kickboxers
American Muay Thai practitioners
Living people
American male actors of Filipino descent
Sportspeople from San Jose, California
Action choreographers
20th-century American male actors
21st-century American male actors